Africalpe intrusa is a moth of the family Erebidae. It is found in Saudi Arabia, Oman, the United Arab Emirates, Yemen, parts of Israel, eastern and north-eastern Africa (including Libya and Sudan) and the Western Sahara.

Adults are on wing nearly year round, except December and January.

External links
Image (scroll down)
Checklist of moths of Sudan

Calpinae
Moths of Asia
Moths of Africa
Moths described in 1939